Creeker is the sixth full-length studio album by American musician Ryan Upchurch. It shows Upchurch focusing on hard rock and southern rock rather than the country or rap songs he is normally known for. It was released on February 12, 2018 via Redneck Nation Records. The album debuted at number 35 on the Billboard 200 albums chart in the United States. It also peaked at No. 5 on the Top Country Albums chart and No. 6 on the Top Rock Albums chart.

Its sequel, Creeker II, was released on April 20, 2019.

Track listing

Charts

References

External links
Creeker by Upchurch on iTunes
Upchurch© Creeker album on Redneck Nation

2017 albums
Upchurch (musician) albums